General elections were held in Puerto Rico on 2 November 1948, which included the first-ever elections for the position of governor, who had previously been appointed by the President of the United States. Luis Muñoz Marín of the Popular Democratic Party won the gubernatorial elections with 61.2% of the vote, becoming the first ever popularly elected governor of Puerto Rico.

Results

Governor

References

Puerto Rico
General elections in Puerto Rico
Elections
Puerto Rico